Ceno Aleksandrovski (born 27 January 1964) is a retired Macedonian football midfielder.

Club career
He started playing with Macedonian side FK Teteks in 1984 playing at that time in Yugoslav third level. Immediately that first season they achieved promotion, and Aleksandrovski played with Teteks in the following two seasons in the Yugoslav Second League. His consistent performances earned him a move to the capital, Belgrade, and a contract with Serbian side FK Rad playing in the 1987–88 Yugoslav First League. The following season, he moved to Serbian side OFK Kikinda playing in the Yugoslav Second League.

He later worked for the commission for youth football development.

References

1964 births
Living people
Macedonian footballers
Yugoslav footballers
Association football midfielders
FK Teteks players
FK Rad players
OFK Kikinda players
Yugoslav First League players